The 1964 Nebraska gubernatorial election was held on November 3, 1964, and featured incumbent Governor Frank B. Morrison, a Democrat, defeating Republican nominee, Lieutenant Governor Dwight W. Burney, to win a third and final two-year term in office.

Democratic primary

Candidates
Charles A. Bates
Tony Mangiamelli
Frank B. Morrison, incumbent Governor

Results

Republican primary

Candidates
Leo N. Bartunek
Dwight W. Burney, Lieutenant Governor and former Governor
Roland L. Ehlers
Albert E. Hahn
Jack Romans, member of the Nebraska Legislature

Results

General election

Results

References

Gubernatorial
1964
Nebraska
November 1964 events in the United States